RL: Ements is the debut studio album by American singer RL, formerly front man of the band Next. It was released by J Records on April 23, 2002, in the United States. RL: Ements debuted and peaked at number six on the US Billboard Top R&B/Hip-Hop Albums. The album failed to produce any charting singles on the US Billboard Hot 100.

Critical reception

Allmusic editor Jason Birchmeier found that "RL is no Usher. But that isn't to say his debut album, RL: Ements, proves disappointing. In fact, it's a respectable debut that's unfortunately hurt by a lack of known collaborators [...] Like similar male vocalists such as Nate Dogg and Carl Thomas, RL struggles on his own. He's certainly no singer/songwriter, and his charisma unfortunately isn't as abundant as his poster-boy looks and sultry musings. And unless those looks and musings cause you to swoon, you're left feeling a little bored during the album's long middle stretch, which is devoid of guests [...] RL doesn't really have anything extraordinary to offer."

Track listing

Notes
 denotes co-producer

Charts

References

R. L. Huggar albums
2002 debut albums
Albums produced by Tim & Bob
Albums produced by Battlecat (producer)
Albums produced by Bryan-Michael Cox
Albums produced by Jermaine Dupri
Albums produced by Rick Rock
Albums produced by the Underdogs (production team)